Giuseppe Iannaccone is an Italian scientist, engineer and author in the field of solid-state electronics and quantum transport. He is Professor of Electronics at the University of Pisa, Italy, Fellow of the Institute of Electrical and Electronics Engineers (IEEE), and Fellow of the American Physical Society (APS).

Early life and education
Giuseppe Iannaccone was born in Avellino in 1968 and grew up in Livorno graduating from high school in 1986. He received his MS and PhD in Electrical Engineering from the University of Pisa in 1992 and 1996, respectively.

Honors and awards
 Fellow of the Institute of Electrical and Electronics Engineers (IEEE) in 2015 for contributions to modeling transport and noise processes in nanoelectronic devices
 Fellow of the American Physical Society (APS) in 2015 for contributions to the theory of quantum transport and noise in mesoscopic and nanoelectronic devices and to their application in electronics.

References

External links 
 Giuseppe Iannaccone's home page
 University of Pisa faculty profile
 Google scholar page

Fellow Members of the IEEE
Living people
Year of birth missing (living people)
Fellows of the American Physical Society